The men's tanding 90 kilograms competition at the 2018 Asian Games took place from 23 to 27 August 2018 at Padepokan Pencak Silat, Taman Mini Indonesia Indah, Jakarta, Indonesia.

Schedule
All times are Western Indonesia Time (UTC+07:00)

Results

References

External links
Official website

Men's tanding 90 kg